The Montbéliarde is a breed of red pied dairy cattle from the area of Montbéliard, in the département of Doubs, in the Bourgogne-Franche-Comté region of eastern France. It is used mainly for dairying and particularly for cheesemaking.

History
The name Montbéliarde was first used by Joseph Graber in 1872, when exhibiting a group of cattle at the Langres agricultural competition.  Before this the local stock from indigenous multipurpose breeds such as Fémeline and Tourache (later known as Comtoise) had been improved by Mennonite farmers from Switzerland, and named Franco-Swiss. In 1889, the breed was accepted officially, and a stud book was founded. Since 1980, the breed has been selected for good roughage conversion. After 1900, many cattle were sold to the Midi region and Algeria.

In the 1970s, Red Holstein was crossed into the breed. At the same time, they sporadically crossed with Fleckvieh bulls, but this was not very successful. In the 1990s, Montbéliarde cattle were used for crossing into the Danish Red cattle and Vorderwalder Cattle breeds.

Characteristics

The animals are red pied with white heads and short horns, and of dairy type. The milk is particularly well suited to cheesemaking because of a high frequency of kappa casein BB variants, giving higher yields of cheese. Being of less extreme dairy type than modern Holsteins, the cows have lower milk yields, but better longevity and fertility and lower cell counts in the milk, indicating lower mastitis incidence.

Uses
Montbéliarde cattle are mainly a dairy breed, but have better beef characteristics than Holstein cattle. The milk protein is of a type well suited to cheesemaking, and some herds are fed a hay-based diet to produce milk specifically for this purpose. Cull cows and bull calves are worth more than Holsteins. The breed has spread to many countries and is becoming popular for crossing with Holsteins to give improved longevity and fertility.

Notes

External links
Montbéliarde
 Article on montbéliarde cattle.

Cattle breeds originating in France
Cattle breeds
Montbéliard